Jane Wesman is the president of a PR agency based in New York City that focuses on the book publishing industry.

Biography
Jane Wesman is a New Jersey native and graduate of Simmons College.

While at Grosset & Dunlap she was in charge of the campaign for RN: The Memoirs of Richard Nixon (1978).

Wesman founded Jane Wesman Public Relations, a firm specializing in book publicity campaigns, in 1980.

Wesman is the author of Dive Right In: The Sharks Won't Bite (Prentice Hall, 1995).  Articles Wesman has authored have appeared in outlets including American Bookseller, Professional Performance, Enterprising Women, foxbusiness.com and Inc.

She is married to attorney Donald Savelson, who is a partner at Proskauer Rose and chairman of the board of the Bronx Museum of the Arts.

References

External links
 Jane Wesman bio and interview on Voice America

Living people
American public relations people
Marketing women
Year of birth missing (living people)